Food (established 1998) is an experimental jazz band initiated by British woodwind multi-instrumentalist Iain Ballamy and Norwegian percussionist Thomas Strønen after a coincidental meeting first in Trondheim, Norway and later in Molde in 1997. They played two gigs at Moldejazz 1998, which were recorded live to two-track, and became their first album Food (2000).

Food highlights the delicate balance between Ballamy's melodic and lyrical playing and the electronic soundscapes and grooves from Strønen. They play as a duo, as well as with invited guests, such as on the second album, Organic and GM Food. Both of the two first albums were published on Ballamy's short-lived Feral Records, before the quartet moved to Rune Grammofon, where they released two more albums, Veggie (2002) and Last Supper (2004). These albums were with Henriksen and Eilertsen. Ballamy and Strønen played as a duo featuring Maria Kannegaard and Ashley Slater for the 5th album Molecular Gastronomy (2006). The next two releases incorporated Nils Petter Molvær, and others.

Band members
Regular
Iain Ballamy – saxophone
Thomas Strønen – drums & electronics

Additional
Arve Henriksen – trumpet, vocals & electronics
Mats Eilertsen – double bass & electronics
Nils-Olav Johansen – guitar, vocals & electronics
Tom Arthurs – trumpet
Maria Kannegaard – keyboards
Ashley Slater – trombone
Nils Petter Molvær – trumpet & electronics
Christian Fennesz – guitar & electronics
Eivind Aarset – guitar & electronics
R.A Ramamani – vocals
Joe Salyers - tambourine and triangle
Ravi Chary – sitar
Prakash Sontakke – slide guitar
Morten Qvenild – keyboards

Discography
 1999: Food (Feral Records), Quartet: Iain Ballamy (saxophones), Arve Henriksen (trumpet, vocals, electronics), Mats Eilertsen (double-bass) & Thomas Strønen (drums, electronics)
 2001: Organic and GM Food (Feral Records), Quartet
 2002: Veggie (Rune Grammofon), Quartet
 2004: Last supper (Rune Grammofon), Quartet
 2007: Molecular Gastronomy (Rune Grammofon), Duo: Iain Ballamy & Thomas Strønen, feat. Maria Kannegaard & Ashley Slater
 2010: Quiet Inlet (ECM), Duo feat. Christian Fennesz, Eivind Aarset, Prakash Sontakke & Nils Petter Molvær
 2012: Mercurial Balm (ECM), Duo feat. Christian Fennesz, Eivind Aarset, Prakash Sontakke & Nils Petter Molvær
 2015: This Is Not a Miracle (ECM), feat. Christian Fennesz

References

External links
Food on Thomas Strønen Official Website

Norwegian jazz ensembles
Norwegian experimental musical groups
Musical groups established in 1998
Musical groups from Oslo
Rune Grammofon artists
ECM Records artists